Barney Owen Angus Clarke (6 April 1927 – 8 March 1999) was a champion New Zealand light heavyweight boxer.

Early life
Clarke was born in Auckland and was educated at St Peter's College, where he was a foundation pupil and where the sport of boxing was encouraged by the Christian Brothers so that the boys could defend themselves against bullying. The school boxing championships were held annually, usually at the Municipal Hall, Newmarket.

Boxing career
Clarke was New Zealand Amateur Light heavyweight champion in 1947 and 1948. On 23 May 1949, he became New Zealand Professional Light heavyweight Champion when he defeated Tommy Downes, on points, in 15 rounds, at the Dunedin Town Hall, before a crowd of 2000. Clarke held the title - successfully defending it twice, against Downes and Ray Stevens, until 18 August 1949 when he was defeated by Ray Stevens at Wanganui, also on points in 15 rounds. In his professional career, Clarke fought thirteen bouts, winning 6 (including one knockout) and losing six (one knockout), with one bout drawn. Clarke's last professional bout was on 1 March 1952 at the Mangakino Domain, Mangakino.

Death
Clarke died on 8 March 1999, and his ashes were buried at North Shore Memorial Park, Albany.

References

External links
 BoxRec - Boxing Records (Barney Clarke) (Retrieved 16 June 2010)

1927 births
1999 deaths
Boxers from Auckland
People educated at St Peter's College, Auckland
Light-heavyweight boxers
New Zealand male boxers
New Zealand professional boxing champions
Burials at North Shore Memorial Park